Dimitri Fautrai (born in Guadeloupe) is a French football player who currently plays for French club L'Etoile de Morne-à-l'Eau on the island of Guadeloupe in the Guadeloupe Division d'Honneur. He plays as an attacking midfielder and, before joining his current club, had a stint in metropolitan France with professional club Lille OSC from 2005–2006. Fautrai played with the club's reserve team in the Championnat de France amateur appearing in six matches with no goals.

References

External links
 Profile at FootballDatabase

Living people
French footballers
Guadeloupean footballers
French people of Guadeloupean descent
2011 CONCACAF Gold Cup players
Association football midfielders
Year of birth missing (living people)
Guadeloupe international footballers